The Mountain View Fire was a fire that erupted near Walker, California, on November 17, 2020. As of December 11, 2020, the fire was fully contained, and claimed one life. The fire crossed the Nevada border into Douglas County. The fire was a ground fire and there was little activity due to snow.

Impact 

The fire caused evacuations for the towns of Walker, Topaz, and Coleville, and one person died from the fires, whose name was Sallie Joseph, aged 69. Governor Gavin Newsom issued a disaster declaration for both Pinehaven and Mountain View fires.

References

External links 
 Mountain View Fire (InciWeb Incident Page) (National Wildfire Coordinating Group)
 Mountain View Fire Incident, Mono County California

2020 California wildfires
Wildfires in Mono County, California
2020 Nevada wildfires
Wildfires in Alpine County, California
November 2020 events in the United States